Rosalie is a feminine given name, the French, German, and Dutch form of the Roman name Rosalia, which was ultimately derived from the Latin word rosa, meaning rose. The name may also be spelled Rozalie in Dutch and Rosalee or Rosaleigh in English. Diminutives for the name include Rosa, Rose, Roz, or Rosie.

Notable people with the name include:

 Rosalie Abella (born 1946), Canadian jurist
 Rosalie Abrams (1921–2010), American playwright
 Rosalie Adams, British governor
 Rosalie Allen (1924–2003), American country singer, songwriter, guitarist, columnist and television and radio host 
 Rosalie Bertell (1929–2012), American scientist
 Rosalie Birch (born 1983), English cricketer
 Rosalie Boyd (born 1987), Australian handball player
 Rosalie Bradford (1942–2006), American woman
 Rosalie de Constant (1758–1834), Swiss naturalist
 Rosalie Craig (born 1981), English actress
 Rosalie Crutchley (1920-1997), British actress
 Rosalie Cunningham (born 1990), English singer-songwriter
 Rosalie Deighton (born 1976), Dutch singer 
 Rosalie Dreyer (1895-1987), Swiss nurse
 Rosalie Duthé (1748-1830), French courtesan
 Rosalie Edge (1877–1962), American socialite, suffragist, and amateur birdwatcher
 Rosalie Emslie (1891-1977), British artist
 Rosalie Filleul (1752–1794), French artist
 Rosalie Fougelberg (1841–1911), Swedish dentist 
 Rosalie Konou, Assistant Attorney General of the Marshall Islands
 Rosalie Anderson MacDowell, American actress
 Rosalie A. Reed (born 1945), American veterinarian
 Rosalie Rendu (1786–1856), venerated by the Roman Catholic Church
 Rosalie Roos, Swedish feminist
 Rosalie Selfridge, known as Rose Selfridge (1860–1918), property developer
 Rosalie Sjöman, Swedish photographer 
 Rosalie Sorrels, American folk singer-songwriter
 Rosalie Thomass (born 1987), German actress
 Rosalie Trombley, American music executive
 Rosalie Varda (born 1958), French costume designer
 Rosalie E. Wahl (1924–2013), American lawyer
 Rosalie Wilkins (born 1946), British politician
 Rosalie Williams, British actress
 Rosalie Woodruff, Australian politician

In fiction
 Rosalie Lamorlière, in The Rose of Versailles
 Rosalie Hale, vampire in Stephenie Meyer's Twilight series
 Rosalie Murray/Rosalie Ashby, in Anne Bronte's Agnes Grey
 Rosalie Otterbourne, in Agatha Christie's Death on the Nile

See also
 Rosalie (disambiguation)
 Rose (given name)
 Rosie (given name)

References

English feminine given names
Feminine given names
English given names
Given names derived from plants or flowers